James Marcel Stinson (1969–2002) was a Detroit techno producer and artist. With Gerald Donald he formed the afrofuturist techno duo Drexciya. He released music under the aliases Shifted Phases, The Other People Place, Transllusion, Lab Rat XL, Abstract Thought, Elecktroids, L.A.M., Jack Peoples and Clarence.

Discography

As Drexciya

Studio albums 
 Neptune's Lair (1999), Tresor
 Harnessed the Storm (2002), Tresor
 Grava 4 (2002), Clone

Compilation albums 
 The Quest (1997), Submerge
 Journey of the Deep Sea Dweller I (2011), Clone
 Journey of the Deep Sea Dweller II (2012), Clone
 Journey of the Deep Sea Dweller III (2013), Clone
 Journey of the Deep Sea Dweller IV (2013), Clone

EPs 
 Deep Sea Dweller (1992), Shockwave Records
 Drexciya 2: Bubble Metropolis (1993), Underground Resistance
 Drexciya 3: Molecular Enhancement (1994), Rephlex, Submerge
 Drexciya 4: The Unknown Aquazone (1994), Submerge
 Aquatic Invasion (1994), Underground Resistance
 The Journey Home (1995), Warp Records
 The Return of Drexciya (1996), Underground Resistance
 Uncharted (1997), Somewhere in Detroit
 Hydro Doorways (2000), Tresor

Singles 
 "Fusion Flats" (2000), Tresor
 "Digital Tsunami" (2001), Tresor
 "Drexciyan R.E.S.T. Principle" (2002), Clone

As Transllusion

Studio albums 
 The Opening Of The Cerebral Gate (2001), Supremat
 L.I.F.E. (2002), Rephlex

Singles 
 "Mind Over Positive And Negative Dimensional Matter" (2001), Supremat
 "Third Eye" EP (2002), Rephlex
 "A Moment of Insanity" (2018), Clone

As Shifted Phases

Studio albums 
 The Cosmic Memoirs Of The Late Great Rupert J. Rosinthrope (2002), Tresor

References

External links 
James Stinson on Discogs

American techno musicians
1969 births
2002 deaths